Strategic Information Technology Ltd. (SIT) develops and sells banking software to banks, trust companies, credit unions, building societies, manufacturers and franchisors. SIT was formed in 1988 and is located in Stouffville, Ontario, Canada.

Software companies of Canada